Fairmont Pacific Rim is an upscale hotel and condominium building in Vancouver, British Columbia. It stands at 140 m or 44 stories tall and was completed just prior to the 2010 Winter Olympics on February 4, 2010.

History
The skyscraper, which is part of the Fairmont Hotels and Resorts chain, is located at 1038 Canada Place in Downtown Vancouver in the Coal Harbour neighborhood by the Burrard Inlet waterfront. Right beside the Shaw Tower, it is also attached to the West Building of the Vancouver Convention & Exhibition Centre. The Southern and Eastern exteriors are wrapped with an art installation of a Liam Gillick poem. Under the Tunnel SkyTrain Waterfront Station. Fairmont Pacific Rim was developed by Westbank Corp. and the Peterson Group with architecture by James KM Cheng Architects Inc.

This is the fourth Fairmont Hotel in the Vancouver Metropolitan Area. The hotel occupies the first 22 floors of the 44 storey building, with the remaining floors being condominiums. There are a total of 175 residential condominium units beginning from the 23rd floor. The entrance for the residential units is located at 1011 Cordova Street W.

The condominiums were pre-sold in 2007, at a price of $2,100 per square foot, one of the highest in Canada at the time.

Glee actor Cory Monteith was found dead in his hotel room on July 13, 2013. He was 31 years old. His cause of death was a toxic overdose of heroin and alcohol.

See also
List of tallest buildings in Vancouver

References

External links 
 Fairmont Pacific Rim
 Fairmont Pacific Rim - 1011 W Cordova St, Vancouver, BC
 City of Vancouver Development Permit Board application (PDF)

Hotels in Vancouver
Skyscrapers in Vancouver
Pacifc Rim
Condo hotels in Canada
Residential buildings completed in 2010
Residential skyscrapers in Canada
Skyscraper hotels in Canada
Hotel buildings completed in 2010
Hotels established in 2010
James K. M. Cheng buildings
2010 establishments in British Columbia